Songs in the Key of X: Music from and Inspired by the X-Files is a 1996 compilation album released in association with the American science fiction television series The X-Files. The album contained a mixture of songs that were either featured in the series, or shared thematic elements with it. Songs in the Key of X peaked at No. 47 on the Billboard 200 album sales chart after its release. The album's title is a play on the title of Stevie Wonder's 1976 album Songs in the Key of Life.

The album has received positive reviews from critics, with one review describing it as "easily the most ambitious record ever assembled for a TV soundtrack". The song "Hands of Death (Burn Baby Burn)" received a nomination for the Grammy Award for Best Metal Performance in 1997, losing to Rage Against the Machine. The album also features two songs hidden in the pregap before the start of the first track, both recorded by Nick Cave and The Dirty Three.

Production

When plans for the album were initially proposed, executives at both Fox Broadcasting Company—the network responsible for the series—and Warner Bros. Records began compiling a list of possible inclusions, most of which were eventually rejected. Artists such as Tom Petty, Bruce Springsteen and Seal were approached to possibly contribute material. Although all three were admitted fans of the series, none were able to get involved in the project—Petty was unable to commit due to a tour, Springsteen was contractually tied to Sony Music Entertainment, while Seal was "snowboarding in South America or somewhere".

Elvis Costello and Brian Eno's track, "My Dark Life", came about as a result of album producer David Was asking Costello to provide a song that would sound like "'you went into the studio with Brian Eno"—the two musicians had recently met at a film screening at Paul McCartney's home, and reconvened to record the song the following week. R.E.M. and author William S. Burroughs collaborated on a new version of "Star Me Kitten", a song that had originally appeared on the band's 1992 album Automatic for the People. Rob Zombie has described his collaboration with Alice Cooper on the song "Hands of Death (Burn Baby Burn)" as one of the "great moments where you really feel like you've made your dreams come true". Zombie and Cooper were nominated for the Grammy Award for Best Metal Performance in 1997 for the song, losing out to Rage Against the Machine's "Tire Me".

Several of the songs on the album were used in episodes of the series. Soul Coughing's "Unmarked Helicopters" appeared in the fourth season episode "Max", while Nick Cave's "Red Right Hand" was heard during the second season episode "Ascension", and Screamin' Jay Hawkins' "Frenzy" appeared in the second-season episode "Humbug". Three of the artists featured on the album would also go on to contribute songs to The X-Files: The Album, the soundtrack to the series' 1998 feature film adaptation—Foo Fighters' "Walking After You", Soul Coughing's "16 Horses" and Filter's "One".

Release and reception

Songs in the Key of X was released on March 19, 1996. It would eventually reach a peak chart position of 47 in the Billboard 200 album chart on April 13 that same year, spending a total of ten weeks in the chart. The album also spent five weeks in the Swedish Sverigetopplistan charts, peaking at number 42, and six weeks in the Finland's Official List chart, reaching a peak at number 24.

Reviews for Songs in the Key of X were generally positive. Upon the album's release, Entertainment Weeklys David Browne rated it a B, calling it "easily the most ambitious record ever assembled for a TV soundtrack". Browne felt that the contributions to the album by Sheryl Crow and William S. Burroughs were amongst its highlights, though felt that the compilation was "dragged down by ponderous contributions" from Nick Cave and Elvis Costello. AllMusic's Steven McDonald was mostly positive towards the album, rating it three stars out of five and stating that "while not perfect, the album makes a nice alternative compilation", noting that it shares the television series' "blue-light glow of twisted mystery". McDonald felt that the Foo Fighters cover of Gary Numan's "Down in the Park" and Elvis Costello's "My Dark Life", along with Mark Snow's theme for the series, were the highlights of the compilation. Sandy Masuo, writing for the Los Angeles Times, rated the album three-and-a-half stars out of four, finding that the compilation's "unsettling ambience" suited the "deliciously creepy" atmosphere of the series. Masuo felt that the collaborations between R.E.M. and William S. Burroughs, and Elvis Costello and Brian Eno, ultimately turned out to be "more interesting in theory than in practice"; although adding that "Down in the Park" was the best track present on the compilation, with the contributions of Rob Zombie, Alice Cooper and P.M. Dawn also noted as highlights.

A review for the album in The Independent noted that none of the songs "can really hold a candle to Cave's "Red Right Hand" in capturing the show's sense of fatalistic futility", adding that there seemed to be "a shared soul thing" between Cave and Carter. Ted Cox, writing for the Daily Herald, described the album as "a who's who of modern rock". Cox rated the album three stars out of five, noting that "most of the material hits the fair-to-middling quality level of a neglected album cut or a good B-side"; adding, however, that the album's overall "atmosphere of paranoia and alienation" helped to tie it together. Writing for The Buffalo News, Anthony  rated the album four stars out of five, calling it "a strange, delightful trip".  felt that "Star Me Kitten" was the album's best song, and that Danzig's "Deep" was its "weakest cut". Writing for the Los Angeles Daily News, Fred Shuster felt that compared to other television tie-ins that "aren't worth the aluminum they're recorded on", Songs in the Key of X "is a rare exception because of the unusual quality and rarity of the tracks". Shuster rated the album three stars out of five, describing it as "more imaginative than the show that inspired it".

Track listing

Producers used the Compact Disc's pregap, so a listener would have to actually manually rewind the first track a full nine minutes to hear two additional hidden tracks, "Time Jesum Transeuntum Et Non Riverentum" and a cover of The X-Files theme song, both performed by Nick Cave and Dirty Three. This is hinted at in the album's liner booklet, which notes "Nick Cave and the Dirty Three would like you to know that "0" is also a number". The use of these hidden tracks has been described as "just the sort of surprise one might have suspected from a show that deals in unexplainable mysteries". Not all CD or DVD players will allow the album to be "rewound" back to these tracks as this violates Red Book standards.

 Charts 
Weekly charts

Year-end charts

 Certifications 

ReferencesWorks cited'

1996 compilation albums
1996 soundtrack albums
Alternative rock compilation albums
Alternative rock soundtracks
Television soundtracks
The X-Files music
Warner Records compilation albums
Warner Records soundtracks
William S. Burroughs albums
albums produced by David Was